Reza Mehmandoust is an Iranian Taekwondo player and was the head coach of Iran's National Taekwondo team  between (1997-2014) and Azerbaijan's National Taekwondo men's team since 2014.

Mehmandoust has the title of "2011 world best Taekwondo head coach" from (W.T.F).
Iran's National Taekwondo team became world champion in 2011 under his guidance.

References 

Year of birth missing (living people)
Living people
Iranian male taekwondo practitioners
Taekwondo practitioners at the 1992 Summer Olympics
Islamic Republic of Iran Army soldiers of the Iran–Iraq War
20th-century Iranian people
21st-century Iranian people